Osmunda lancea is a fern in the genus Osmunda, section Euosmunda. It is found in Japan.

It often hybridizes with Osmunda japonica to produce O. × intermedia.

References

External links
picture
springerlink.com
henriettes-herb.com

Osmundales
Ferns of Asia